"Faking Love" is a song written by Matraca Berg and Bobby Braddock, and recorded by American country music artists T. G. Sheppard and Karen Brooks.  It was released in October 1982 as the second single from Sheppard's  album Perfect Stranger.  The single went to number one for one week and spent a total of thirteen weeks within the Top 40.

Charts

Weekly charts

Year-end charts

References

1982 singles
Male–female vocal duets
1982 songs
Karen Brooks songs
Songs written by Matraca Berg
Songs written by Bobby Braddock
T. G. Sheppard songs
Song recordings produced by Buddy Killen
Warner Records singles
Curb Records singles